Shoeshine may refer to:

Shoeshine (film) (Sciuscià), a 1946 film directed by Vittorio De Sica
Shoe polish
Shoeshiner
Shoeshine Boy, the alter ego of the starring character in the animated TV series, Underdog
In boxing, shoeshining is the term often given to a rapid series of uppercuts
"Shoeshine", an episode of the television series Teletubbies